John Edward Flowers "Jeffrey" Dell (7 May 1899 – 24 February 1985) was a British writer, screenwriter, and film director. He is also remembered for his 1939 novel Nobody Ordered Wolves, a satire on the British film industry. His other novels include News for Heaven (1944) and The Hoffmann Episode (1954). He co-wrote the 1937 play Blondie White, later adapted into a Hollywood film. Dell was the son of John Edward Dell (1875–1936) and Gertrude Dell (née Flowers; 1874–1947).

Filmography

Director
 The Flemish Farm (1943)
 Don't Take It to Heart (1948)
 It's Hard to Be Good (1948)
 The Dark Man (1951)
 Carlton-Browne of the F.O. (co-director, 1959)

Screenwriter
 Sanders of the River (1935)
 Secret Lives (1937)
 Make-Up (1937)
 Night Alone (1938)
 Kate Plus Ten (1938)
 Freedom Radio (1941)
 The Saint's Vacation (1941)
 Thunder Rock (1942)
 The Flemish Farm (1943)
 Don't Take It to Heart (1944)
 It's Hard to Be Good (1948)
 The Dark Man (1951)
 Lucky Jim (1957)
 Brothers in Law (1957)
 Happy Is the Bride (1958)
 As the Sea Rages (1959)
 The Treasure of San Teresa (1959)
 Cone of Silence (1960)
 A French Mistress (1960)
 Suspect (1960)
 Rotten to the Core (1965)
 The Family Way (1966)

Adapted from his works
 Payment Deferred (1932)
 The Firebird (1934)
 Spies of the Air (1939)
 Footsteps in the Dark (1941)

References

External links

1899 births
1985 deaths
British film directors
British male screenwriters
20th-century British male writers
20th-century British screenwriters